The Loch Ness Marathon (Gaelic: Marathon Loch Nis) is an annual marathon race in Scotland, held along the famous loch, Loch Ness, ending in Inverness. The event is part of the Festival of Running, held annually at the beginning of October. This also includes a 10K race and a 5K fun run, and attracts over 8,000 participants across all of the events. The first prize in the marathon is approx 1,400 GBP.

The marathon starts near Whitebridge, and follows the southern side of Loch Ness, passing through the villages of Foyers, Inverfarigaig and Dores. The route goes into Inverness, crossing the River Ness by the Ness Bridge in the city centre, and finishes at Bught Park.

The marathon supports several charities, including Highland Hospice, Leonard Cheshire, Maggie's Cancer Caring Centres, Marie Curie Cancer Care, Multiple Sclerosis Society Scotland, and the Scottish Community Foundation. The lead partner charity since 2013 has been Macmillan Cancer Support, who have been involved in the event since 2009.

Kenyan Zakary Kihara was a convincing winner of the 2007 Baxters Loch Ness Marathon in a time of 2 hours 23 minutes. The women's race was won by Banuelia Katesigwa from Tanzania in a time of 2:55. The 2007 event saw 5600 people take part in the three main events - marathon, 10 km, and the 5 km with fifty different nationalities were represented. 

In 2005 Simon Pride from Fochabers won in 2:30:15 whilst Julia Myatt won the women's event in 2.51.56. 18 nationalities were represented in the 2005 event. 

Winners of the 2010 event were Tomas Abyu of Salford Harriers in a time of 2:20:50 and Dinknesh Mekash Tefera from Ethiopia in 02:46:37, a new course record for the women's race.

Past winners
Key:

References

List of winners
Youngson, Colin (2013-08-25). Loch Ness Marathon. Association of Road Racing Statisticians. Retrieved on 2013-10-05.

External links
 Loch Ness Marathon

Sport in Inverness
Marathons in Scotland
Recurring sporting events established in 2002
Autumn events in Scotland
Loch Ness